The Battalions of Light Infantry of Africa (French: Bataillons d'Infanterie Légère d'Afrique or BILA), better known under the acronym Bat' d'Af', were French infantry and construction units, serving in Northern Africa, made up of men with prison records who still had to do their military service, or soldiers with serious disciplinary records.

History

Creation
Created by King Louis Philippe I on 13 June 1832, shortly after the French Foreign Legion, the ''Bat' d'Af were part of the Army of Africa and were stationed in Tataouine, Tunisia, in one of the most arid and hostile regions of the French colonial empire. The original Ordonnance royale (Royal order) creating this corps provided for 2 battalions, each of 8 companies. A third battalion was created in September 1833. According to the order the rank and file of these units were to be drawn from:
(i) serving soldiers who had been sentenced to existing disciplinary companies and who had not completed their period of army service upon release; and
(ii) civilian convicts who upon completing terms of imprisonment had still to meet their obligations for compulsory military service.

Initial service

The newly raised Bat' d'Af' saw active service for the first time during the conquest of Algeria. They participated in operations at Bougie in 1835 and took part in the siege of Constantine the following year. Between 3 and 6 February 1840 at Mazagran in Algeria, a detachment of 123 chasseurs of the 1st BILA, under Captain Lelievre, held off repeated assaults by several thousand Arabs. This action won the first battle honour for the corps and was subsequently commemorated in all battalions by memorial ceremonies on 6 February each year. A platoon of the Bat' d'Af served at the Battle of Taghit when the French fort of Taghit was besieged by 4,000 Moroccan tribesmen, who were eventually repelled.

Subsequent history until 1920

As discipline and living conditions in the Bat' d'Af' were harsh, Bataillonnaires, colloquially named Zéphyrs or Joyeux ("Joyous ones"), usually nicknamed their unit l'Enfer ("the Hell") or, ironically, Biribi (a game of chance of that period). However, they fought creditably in the Crimean war plus the Mexican Intervention; and won honours during the First World War and in the various colonial wars. They also assumed the role of construction troops, building not only desert forts but also roads and bridges.

"Biribi" reached a peak between the 1880s and 90s, when it played its most conspicuous role. In May 1888 the corps was enlarged to 5 battalions, each of 6 companies. Three battalions (3rd, 4th and 5th) were based in Tunisia while the remaining units served in the southern districts of Algeria. On the eve of World War I 2 battalions were on active service in Morocco. During 1914-18 3 bataillons de Marche (temporary "marching battalions" formed for particular purposes) served on the Western Front with distinction (see Battle Honours and Fourragères below). The permanent units remained in French North Africa, providing garrisons and mobile columns.

Character
One of the considerations behind the creation and expansion of the French army's disciplinary battalions was the need to resolve a seeming contradiction: men whose crimes in civilian life had resulted in the loss of civil rights gained an undeserved privilege in being exempted from military service. As their enlistment in regular units could have spread indiscipline among young serving soldiers, the solution was to draft them into separate disciplinary battalions.

Although the Bats d'Af are commonly described as penal units, their purpose was not punishment but segregation in what were officially described as "redemptive combat units" (corps d'epreuve). In addition to petty criminals and military offenders, the rank and file also included a number of soldiers suspected of Communard sympathies during the 1870s and the ringleaders of several mutinies in metropolitan regiments in the early 1900s. Finally, there were also some volunteers who chose for reasons of promotion or other motives to serve in the Bats d'Af.

In opposition to prevailing assumptions about criminality at the time, influenced by Cesare Lombroso's eugenistic theories, the disciplinary battalions of the French Republic were supposed to show that criminals could be redeemed through hard work and combat. 

Legislation dated 21 March 1905 specified that individuals sentenced to prison terms of six months or more, or who had been convicted of any offence twice or more, should be drafted into the Bats d'Af when called up for military service. However those who distinguished themselves "in the face of the enemy", or who had concluded more than eight months of service with good behaviour in the Light Infantry of Africa, had the option of transferring to regular units of the army to complete their term of enlistment. 

Georges Darien, a volunteer who enlisted in the Train (Army Transport Corps) during the 1880s where he was condemned for insubordination, was sent for 33 months in the Bat' d'Af'. In 1890, he published a novel named Biribi where he described, in possibly exaggerated terms, the harsh treatment and corporal punishments which he endured in the Bat' d'Af.

Many Bataillonnaires displayed tattoos covering much of the body, as was customary in the French criminal underworld of the early 20th century (see examples here).

Interwar period and World War II
Their bad reputation and doubts about their efficiency as a mean of rehabilitation led to the dissolution of most Battalions of Light Infantry of Africa during the interwar period. Following the disbandment of the 1st and 2nd Battalions, serving personnel were transferred to the 3rd Battalion in 1927. In the course of France's general mobilisation in 1939, 12 additional battalions of Light Infantry (BIL) were created but the historic title of Battalions of Light Infantry of Africa (BILA) was retained only by those units continuing to serve in French North Africa. During 1939-40 both the BIL and the BILA served primarily as construction units, working on fortifications, railways and roads in France, Algeria, Tunisia and Morocco. All were disbanded between July and October 1940 following the battle of France.

Final years and disbandment
A single company of the BILA was re-established in April 1944, becoming a full battalion in September 1948. It was based at Tataouine, the original garrison of the Bat' d'Af'.  This formation provided a marching battalion, renamed the Bataillon d'Infanterie légère d'Outre-Mer (BILOM) which participated in the First Indochina War by manning a number of posts in the Bencat sector. Upon returning to Tunisia in November 1952 it was merged with the depot detachments of the BILA. Now designated as the 3rd BILA, the unit was transferred to Algeria following Tunisian independence in November 1956. The battalion was reduced to one company in October 1962, which was stationed near the French nuclear testing facilities in the Sahara from 1963 to 1966. This last remaining component of the ''Bat' d'Af was then transferred to French Somaliland where it was disbanded on 31 March 1972.

Between 600,000 and 800,000 men served in the Bat' d'Af' from 1832 to 1970, mostly from the working class of Paris and Marseille.

 Uniforms and insignia 
Throughout most of their history the Bat' d'Af' wore the uniform of the French line infantry, modified according to the overseas conditions under which they had to serve and with some regimental distinctions. The latter included yellow piping on the blue and red kepi, yellow collar numbers, and for full dress, red epaulettes with green woollen fringes. As light infantry the Bat' d'Af' wore silver buttons and rank braiding rather than the bronze or gold of the line regiments. A bugle horn appeared on buttons and other insignia.

Prior to 1914, the most commonly worn uniform of these units was white fatigue dress with white covered kepi and blue waist sash. The medium blue greatcoat of the French infantry was worn on the march. A full dress uniform of dark blue tunic and red trousers (white trousers in hot weather) could be worn on parade or for off-duty wear. From World War I onwards the Bat' d'Af' were distinguished by "violet" (light purple/red) collar patch braiding and numbers on their khaki drill uniforms.

From 1915, in common with other units of the Armée d'Afrique, a more practical khaki uniform was adopted for service on the Western Front. Khaki pith helmets appeared during the 1920s and 30s as an alternative to the kepi, which itself could be worn with khaki or white covers according to the occasion. White dress uniforms were reserved for cadres.

Absence of flags
A peculiarity of the BILA was that until 1952 the various battalions did not have the right to carry standards, although this was a universal privilege accorded to other French army regiments. Entitlement to this and other distinctions was persistently argued by the "Association of Former Officers of the Joyeux" chaired by General Alfred Maurice Cazaud.

March
The march of the Bat d'Af is Les Bataillonnaires:

(*) note that "on s'en fout" would be more accurately translated into "we don't give a fuck" than "we don't care"

 Battalions 

 1er BILA 
Formed in 1832 ; disbanded in 1940

 2e BILA 
Formed in 1832 ; disbanded in 1927. Created by order of 3 June 1832 at Birkhadem, stationed at Bougie, then at Laghouat (Algiers) in 19005. On 1 January 1849, the 2nd BILA, under the command of battalion commander Etienney, was garrisoned at Miliana in Algeria.

On 28 November 1870, during the Franco-Prussian war, the battle of Beaune-la-Rolande took place where two companies of the 2nd BILA, which made up the African Light Infantry Regiment, were engaged.  From 1887 to 1896, the battalion was commanded by Antoine Léonor de Perier, father of general Pierre-Étienne de Perier.  In operation in Morocco, with depots in Mcheyda and El Hadjeb in 19146. During the 1914-1918 war, the 2nd BILA remained stationed in North Africa, but contributed to the formation of the 1st, 2nd and 3rd BMILA, which were called up to fight in Belgium and in metropolitan France. It was disbanded in 1927, after the end of the Rif war.  In 1939, it was reconstituted in embryonic form (a single company) in Corsica.

 3e BILA 
Formed in 1833 ; disbanded in 1972

 4e BILA 
Formed in 1888 ; disbanded in 1927

 5e BILA 
Formed in 1888 ; disbanded in 1925

 Fourragères 
Those units received the fourragères of the following medals :

 Médaille militaire  : 1er BILA
 Croix de guerre 14-18  : 2e BILA
 Légion d'honneur  : 3e BMILA

 Battle honours 
After 1952 (see above) the Regimental flag of the Bat' d'Af' were embroidered those battle honours :

Mazagran 1840
Maison du Passeur 1914
Verdun 1916
Reims 1918
La Suippe 1918

Cadres (NCOs and officers)
The difficult task of obtaining sufficient non-commissioned officers for the Bat' d'Af' was resolved by creating two categories of sous-officiers. The cadres blancs ("white cadres"), like the officers, were professional soldiers who served a term with the BILA before continuing their careers with other regiments. The cadres noirs ("black cadres") were former bataillonnaires who chose to remain with the Bat' d'Af' on promotion, after finishing their original terms of service.

Disciplinary companies
The Bat' d'Af should not be confused with the compagnies d'exclus ("companies of the excluded" i.e. thieves) of the French Army, which were stationed at Aîn-Sefra in Southern Algeria. These penal units consisted of military convicts condemned to five years or more hard labour and were judged unworthy to carry weapons. By contrast the BILA, while strictly disciplined, were considered as armed and serving soldiers with a generally good combat record.   

Upon completion of their sentences the convicts of the disciplinary companies might however be required to complete their military service in the Bat' d'Af.

See also
Bataillon d'Infanterie légère d'Outre-Mer

References

Bibliography
Anthony Clayton, 'France, Soldiers, and Africa', Brassey's Defence Publishers, 1988
Pierre Dufour, 'Les Bat' d'Af' : les Zéphyrs et les Joyeux (1831–1972)', Pygmalion, 2004 (FR)
 
 
Dominique Kalifa, 'Biribi. Les bagnes coloniaux de l'armée française', Paris, Perrin, 2009, 344 p.  (FR)

Infantry battalions of France
Armée d'Afrique
Military units and formations established in 1832
Military units and formations disestablished in 1972
French Algeria
Penal units